This is a list of libraries in Scotland.

National Libraries 
 National Library of Scotland, Edinburgh

Public libraries by local authority area

Aberdeen City 

 Kincorth Library
 Aberdeen Central Library
 Airyhall Library
 Bridge of Don Library
 Bucksburn Library
 Cornhill Library
 Cove Library (Aberdeen, Scotland)
 Culter Library
 Cults Library and Learning Centre
 Dyce Library
 Ferryhill Library
 Kaimhill Library
 Mastrick Library
 Northfield Library
 Tillydrone Library
 Torry Library
 Woodside Library

Aberdeenshire 

 Aberchirder Library
 Aberdeenshire Library and Information Service Library Headquarters
 Aboyne Library
 Alford Library
 Ballater Library
 Balmedie Library
 Banchory Library
 Banff Library
 Boddam Library
 Bracoden Library
 Cairnbulg/Inverallochy Library
 Cruden Bay Library
 Ellon Library
 Fettercairn Library
 Fraserburgh Library
 Huntly Library
 Insch Library
 Inverbervie Library
 Inverurie Library
 Kemnay Library
 Kintore Library
 Macduff Library
 Mearns Community Library
 Meldrum Library
 Mintlaw Library
 New Pitsligo Library
 Newmachar Library
 Newtonhill Library
 Peterhead Library
 Portlethen Library
 Portsoy Library
 Rosehearty Library
 Stonehaven Library
 Strichen Library
 Turriff Library
 Westhill Library

Angus

 Arbroath Library
 Brechin Library
 Carnoustie Library
 Forfar Library
 Kirriemuir Library
 Monifieth Library
 Montrose Library

Argyll and Bute 

 Campbeltown Library
 Cardross Library
 Dunoon Library
 Helensburgh Library
 Lochgilphead Library
 Oban Library
 Rosneath Library
 Rothesay Library
 Tarbert Library

Clackmannanshire 

 Alloa Library
 Alva Community Access Point
 Clackmannan Community Access Point
 Dollar Community Access Point
 Menstrie Community Access Point
 Tillicoultry Library
 Tullibody Library

Dumfries and Galloway 

 Annan Library
 Castle Douglas Library
 Dalbeattie Library
 Dalry Library (Castle Douglas, Scotland)
 Eastriggs Library
 Ewart Library
 Gatehouse Library
 Georgetown Library
 Gretna Library and Customer Service Centre
 Kirkconnel Library
 Kirkcudbright Library
 Langholm Library
 Lochmaben Library
 Lochside Library
 Lochthorn Library
 Lockerbie Library
 Moffat Library
 Newton Stewart Library
 Port William Library
 Sanquhar Library
 Stranraer Library
 Thornhill Library
 Whithorn Library
 Wigtown Library

Dundee 

 Ardler Community Library
 Arthurstone Community Library
 Charleston Community Centre and Library
 Coldside Community Library
 Douglas Community and Library Centre
 Dundee City Council. Central Library
 Dundee City Council. HUB Community Centre and Library
 Fintry Community Library
 Kirkton Community Centre and Library
 Lochee Community Library
 Menzieshill Community Centre and Library
 Whitfield Community Library & Learning Centre
 Blackness Community Library
 Broughty Ferry Community Library

East Ayrshire 

 Auchinleck Library
 Bellfield Library
 Crosshouse Library
 Cumnock Library
 Dalmellington Library
 Dalrymple Library
 Darvel Library
 Drongan Library
 East Ayrshire Leisure. Dick Institute
 Galston Library
 Kilmaurs Library
 Mauchline Library
 New Cumnock Library
 Newmilns Library
 Patna Community Library
 Stewarton Library

East Dunbartonshire 

 Bishopbriggs Library
 Brookwood Library
 Craighead Library
 Lennoxtown Library
 Lenzie Library
 Milngavie Library
 Westerton Library
 William Patrick Library

East Lothian 

 Dunbar Library
 East Linton Library
 Gullane Library
 Haddington Library
 John Gray Centre (Library)
 Longniddry Library
 Musselburgh Library
 North Berwick Library
 Ormiston Library
 Port Seton Library
 Prestonpans Library
 Tranent Library
 Wallyford Library

East Renfrewshire 

 Barrhead Community Library
 Thornliebank Library 
 Giffnock Library
 Clarkston Library
 Netherlee Library
 Busby Library
 Eaglesham Community Library
 Mearns Community Library
 Neilston Community Library
 Uplawmoor Community Library

City of Edinburgh 

 Balerno Library
 Balgreen Library
 Blackhall Library
 Colinton Library
 Corstorphine Library
 Craigmillar Library
 Currie Library
 Drumbrae Library
 Edinburgh Central Library
 Fountainbridge Library
 Gilmerton Library
 Granton Library
 Kirkliston Library
 Leith Community Library
 McDonald Road Library
 Moredun Library
 Morningside Library
 Muirhouse Library
 Newington Library
 Oxgangs Library
 Piershill Library
 Portobello Library
 Ratho Library
 Sighthill Library
 South Neighbourhood Office and Library
 South Queensferry Library
 Stockbridge library
 Wester Hailes Library

Eilean Siar 

 Castlebay Library
 Daliburgh Community Library
 Lionacleit Community Library
 Shawbost Community Library
 Stornoway Library
 Tarbert Community Library

Falkirk 

 Bo'ness Library
 Bonnybridge Library
 Denny Library
 Falkirk Library
 Grangemouth Library
 Larbert Library
 Meadowbank Library
 Slamannan Library

Fife 

 Aberdour Library
 Anstruther Library
 Auchtermuchty Library
 Benarty Library
 Buckhaven Library and Museum
 Burntisland Library and Museum
 Cadham Library
 Cardenden Library
 Cupar Library
 Dalgety Bay Library
 Duloch Community Campus
 Dunfermline Carnegie Library
 Elie Library
 Inverkeithing Library and Heritage Centre
 Kelty Library
 Kennoway Library
 Kirkcaldy Galleries
 Ladybank Library
 Leslie Library
 Leven Library
 Methil Library and Local Office
 Newport Library and Heritage Centre
 Oakley Library
 Rosyth Library
 Rothes Halls Library
 St Andrews Library
 St Monans Library
 Tayport Library
 Templehall Library
 Valleyfield Library

City of Glasgow 

 Anniesland Library and Learning Centre
 Baillieston Library and Learning Centre
 Barmulloch Library and Learning Centre
 Bridgeton Library and Learning Centre
 Busby Community Library
 Cardonald Library and Learning Centre
 Castlemilk Library and Learning Centre
 Clarkston Community Library
 Couper Institute Library
 Dennistoun Library and Learning Centre
 Drumchapel Library and Learning Centre
 Easterhouse - The Library at the Bridge
 Elder Park Library and Learning Centre
 Giffnock Community Library
 Gorbals Library and Learning Centre
 Govanhill Library and Learning Centre
 Hillhead Library and Learning Centre
 Ibrox Library and Learning Centre
 Knightswood Library and Learning Centre
 Langside Library and Learning Centre
 Library at GOMA
 Maryhill Library and Learning Centre
 Milton Library and Learning Centre
 Netherlee Community Library
 Parkhead Library and Learning Centre
 Partick Library and Learning Centre
 Pollok Library and Learning Centre
 Pollokshaws Library and Learning Centre
 Pollokshields Library and Learning Centre
 Possilpark Library and Learning Centre
 Riddrie Library and Learning Centre
 Royston Library and Learning Centre
 Shettleston Library and Learning Centre
 Springburn Library and Learning Centre
 The Mitchell Library
 Thornliebank Community Library
 Whiteinch Library and Learning Centre
 Woodside Library and Learning Centre

Highland 

 Achiltibuie Library
 Alness Library
 Ardersier Library
 Ardnamurchan Community Library
 Aviemore Library
 Badenoch Library and Learning Centre
 Beauly Library
 Belford Library
 Bettyhill Library/Service Point
 Bonar Bridge Library
 Broadford Library and Service Point
 Brora Library
 Caol Library
 Cromarty Library
 Culloden Library
 Dornoch Library
 Fort William Library
 Fortrose Community Library
 Gairloch Library
 Glenurquhart Community Library
 Golspie Library
 Grantown on Spey Library
 Helmsdale Library/Service Point
 Inshes Community Library
 Invergordon Library
 Inverness Library
 Kinlochleven Library
 Knoydart Library
 Kyle of Lochalsh Library
 Lairg Library Community Centre
 Lochcarron Library
 Muir of Ord Library
 Nairn Library
 Plockton Library
 Portree Community Library
 Tain Library
 Thurso Library
 Ullapool Community Library
 Wick Library

Inverclyde 

 Gourock Library
 Greenock Central Library
 Inverkip and Wemyss Bay Library
 Kilmacolm Library
 Port Glasgow Library
 South West Branch Library
 Watt Library

Midlothian 

 Dalkeith Library
 Danderhall Library
 Gorebridge Library
 Lasswade Library
 Loanhead Library
 Mayfield Library
 Newtongrange Library
 Penicuik Library
 Roslin Library

Moray 

 Aberlour Library
 Buckie Library
 Burghead Library
 Cullen Library
 Dufftown Library
 Elgin Library
 Forres Library
 Keith Library
 Lossiemouth Library
 Milne's Learning Centre
 Tomintoul Library

North Ayrshire 

 Ardrossan Library
 Arran Library
 Beattie Library
 Beith Library
 Bourtreehill Library
 Dalry Library (Dalry, Scotland)
 Dreghorn Library
 Fairlie Library
 Irvine Library
 Kilbirnie Library
 Kilwinning Library
 Largs Library
 Millport Library
 Saltcoats Library
 Skelmorlie Library
 Springside Library
 West Kilbride Library

North Lanarkshire 

 Abronhill Library
 Airdrie Public Library
 Bellshill Cultural Centre Library
 Chapelhall Library
 Chryston Library
 Cleland Library
 Coatbridge Library
 Condorrat Library
 Cumbernauld Central Library
 Eastfield Library
 Kilsyth Library
 Moodiesburn Library
 Motherwell Library
 New Stevenston Library
 Newarthill Library
 Newmains Library
 Shotts Library
 Stepps Library
 Viewpark Library
 Wishaw Library

Orkney Islands 
 Orkney Library and Archive
Stromness Library

Perth & Kinross 

 A. K. Bell Library: Library Headquarters
 Alyth Library
 Auchterarder Library
 Birnam Library
 Blairgowrie Library
 Breadalbane Community Library
 Comrie Library
 Coupar Angus Library
 Loch Leven Community Library
 North Inch Community Library
 Pitlochry Library
 Scone Library
 Strathearn Community Library

Renfrewshire 

 Bishopton Library
 Bridge of Weir Library
 Erskine Library
 Ferguslie Park Library
 Foxbar Library
 Glenburn Library
 Johnstone Library
 Linwood Library
 Lochwinnoch Library
 Paisley Central Library
 Ralston Library
 Renfrew Library

Scottish Borders 

 Coldstream Library
 Duns Library
 Earlston Library
 Eyemouth Library
 Galashiels Library
 Hawick Library
 Innerleithen Library Contact Centre
 Jedburgh Library
 Kelso Library
 Melrose Library
 Peebles Library
 Selkirk Library

Shetland Islands 
 Shetland Library

South Ayrshire 

 Alloway Library
 Ballantrae Library
 Forehill Library
 Girvan Library
 Maybole Library
 Mossblown Library
 Prestwick Library
 South Ayrshire Libraries. Carnegie Library
 Symington Library
 Tarbolton Lorimer Library
 Troon Library

South Lanarkshire 

 Biggar Public Library
 Blackwood and Kirkmuirhill Community Wing (Library)
 Blantyre Library
 Bothwell Library
 Burnbank Library
 Calderwood Library
 Cambuslang Library
 Carluke Library
 Cathkin Library
 East Kilbride Central Library
 Fairhill Library
 Forth Library
 Greenhills Library
 Halfway Library
 Hamilton Town House Library
 Hillhouse Library
 King's Park Library
 Lanark Library
 Larkhall Library
 Lesmahagow Library
 Rutherglen Library
 St Leonards Library
 Stonehouse Library
 Strathaven Library
 Uddingston Library

Stirling 

 Balfron Library
 Bannockburn Library
 Bridge of Allan Library
 Callander Library
 Cambusbarron Library
 Cowie Library
 Doune Library
 Drymen Library
 Dunblane Library
 Fallin Library
 Killin Library
 Plean Library
 Raploch Xpress Library
 St Ninians Library
 Stirling Council Library Service. Central Library
 Strathblane Library

West Dunbartonshire 

 Alexandria Library
 Balloch Library
 Clydebank Library
 Dalmuir Library
 Dumbarton Library
 Duntocher Library
 Parkhall Library

West Lothian 

 Almondbank Library
 Armadale Community Centre and Library
 Bathgate Library
 Blackburn Connected
 Blackridge Library
 Broxburn Library
 Carmondean Library
 East Calder Library
 Fauldhouse Partnership Centre
 Lanthorn Library
 Linlithgow Library
 Pumpherston Library
 West Calder Library
 Whitburn Library

Specialised libraries 
 Advocates Library, Edinburgh
 Innerpeffray Library
 Glasgow Women's Library
 Royal Botanic Garden Edinburgh
 Royal Faculty of Procurators in Glasgow
 Royal Medical Society, Edinburgh
 Scottish Poetry Library, Edinburgh
 Signet Library, Edinburgh

Academic libraries 
 Andersonian Library, University of Strathclyde
 Edinburgh University Library
 Glasgow University Library
 Hunterian Collection, University of Glasgow

See also
 Books in the United Kingdom

References 

 
Scotland
Libraries
Libraries
Libraries